Maine Question 1 may refer to:

2009 Maine Question 1, a 2009 people's veto referendum to repeal a same-sex marriage law
2011 Maine Question 1. a 2011 people's veto referendum to repeal  a law ending Election Day voter registration 
2012 Maine Question 1, a 2012 citizen initiated  referendum to legalize same-sex marriage
2014 Maine Question 1, a 2014 citizen initiated  referendum to ban certain bear hunting methods
2015 Maine Question 1, a 2015 citizen initiated referendum to revise the Maine Clean Elections Act
2016 Maine Question 1, a 2016 citizen initiated referendum to legalize the recreational use of marijuana.
2017 Maine Question 1, a 2017 citizen initiated referendum to legalize the construction of a casino in York County
June 2018 Maine Question 1, a 2018 people's veto referendum to repeal a law delaying ranked-choice voting.
November 2018 Maine Question 1, a 2018 citizen initiated referendum to pass a law creating a home health care program for the elderly and disabled, funded by a tax